RGW may refer to:

 Residential gateway, a hardware device connecting a home network with a wide area network (WAN) or the internet
 RGW, Rat für gegenseitige Wirtschaftshilfe, the East German abbreviation for Comecon
 RGW, relic gravitational waves 
 R.G.W. (song) Japanese-language Christmas song
 Ramsgreave and Wilpshire railway station, England; National Rail station code RGW
 Rio Grande Western Railway 
 RGW is an abbreviation for "red-green-white", just as RGB is an abbreviation for "red-green-blue", which is a very important concept in color television, color photography, etc. See RGB color model.